Robiquetia, commonly known as pouched orchids, or 寄树兰属 (ji shu lan shu), is a genus of flowering plants from the orchid family, Orchidaceae. Plants in this genus are epiphytes with long, sometimes branched, fibrous stems, leathery leaves in two ranks and large numbers of small, densely crowded flowers on a pendulous flowering stem. There are about eighty species found from tropical and subtropical Asia to the Western Pacific.

Description
Orchids in the genus Robiquetia are epiphytic, monopodial herbs with pendulous, fibrous, sometimes branching stems and many smooth roots. The leaves are arranged in two ranks and are thick and leathery, oblong to elliptic, with a divided, asymmetrical, tip. Many small, densely crowded flowers are arranged on a pendulous flowering stem that emerges from a leaf axil. The sepals and petals are similar to each other and the labellum has three lobes and an inflated spur on its tip.

Taxonomy and naming
The genus Robiquetia was first formally described in 1829 by Charles Gaudichaud-Beaupré and the description was published in his book Voyage autour du monde from a specimen collected in the Maluku Islands. The type species is Robiquetia ascendens. The name Robiquetia honours the French chemist Pierre Jean Robiquet. 

Species list:
The following is a list of species of Robiquetia accepted by the World Checklist of Selected Plant Families as of December 2018:
 
 Robiquetia aberrans (Schltr.) Kocyan & Schuit. - Thailand to Malesia
 Robiquetia adelineana P.O'Byrne - Malaysia
 Robiquetia amboinensis (J.J.Sm.) J.J.Sm. - Ambon
 Robiquetia amesiana Kocyan & Schuit.
 Robiquetia anceps J.J.Sm. - Ternate
 Robiquetia andamanica (N.P.Balakr. & N.Bhargava) Kocyan & Schuit.
 Robiquetia angustifolia Schltr. - Sulawesi
 Robiquetia arunachalensis (A.N.Rao) Kocyan & Schuit.
 Robiquetia ascendens Gaudich. - Maluku
 Robiquetia batakensis (Schltr.) Kocyan & Schuit.
 Robiquetia bertholdii (Rchb.f.) Schltr. - Fiji, Santa Cruz Islands, Tonga, Vanuatu 
 Robiquetia bicruris J.J.Sm.
 Robiquetia bifida (Lindl.) Kocyan & Schuit.
 Robiquetia brassii Ormerod - New Guinea
 Robiquetia brevifolia (Lindl.) Garay - Sri Lanka
 Robiquetia brevisaccata (J.J.Sm.) Kocyan & Schuit.
 Robiquetia camptocentrum (Schltr.) J.J.Sm. - New Guinea
 Robiquetia cerina (Rchb.f.) Garay - Philippines
 Robiquetia cladophylax (Schltr.) Kocyan & Schuit.
 Robiquetia compressa (Lindl.) Schltr. - Philippines
 Robiquetia crassa (Ridl.) Schltr. - Sarawak
 Robiquetia crockerensis J.J.Wood & A.L.Lamb in J.J.Wood & al. - Sarawak, Sabah
 Robiquetia culicifera (Ridl.) Kocyan & Schuit.
 Robiquetia dentifera J.J.Sm. - Seram
 Robiquetia discolor (Rchb.f.) Seidenf. & Garay - Philippines
 Robiquetia dutertei Cootes, Naive & M.Leon
 Robiquetia eburnea (W.Suarez & Cootes) Kocyan & Schuit.
 Robiquetia enigma Ferreras & W.Suarez - Philippines
 Robiquetia flammea (R.Boos, Cootes & W.Suarez) Kocyan & Schuit.
 Robiquetia flexa (Rchb.f.) Garay - New Guinea
 Robiquetia forbesii (Ridl.) Kocyan & Schuit.
 Robiquetia gautierensis (J.J.Sm.) Kocyan & Schuit.
 Robiquetia glomerata (Rolfe) Kocyan & Schuit.
 Robiquetia gracilis (Lindl.) Garay - India, Sri Lanka, Andaman and Nicobar Islands
 Robiquetia gracilistipes (Schltr.) J.J.Sm. - Queensland, New Guinea, Solomons
 Robiquetia hamata Schltr. - New Guinea
 Robiquetia hansenii J.J.Sm - Mentawai
 Robiquetia honhoffii (Schuit. & A.Vogel) Kocyan & Schuit.
 Robiquetia inflata (Metusala & P.O'Byrne) Kocyan & Schuit.
 Robiquetia insectifera (J.J.Sm.) Kocyan & Schuit.
 Robiquetia josephiana Manilal & C.S.Kumar - Kerala
 Robiquetia juliae (P.O'Byrne) Kocyan & Schuit.
 Robiquetia kawakamii (J.J.Sm.) Kocyan & Schuit.
 Robiquetia kusaiensis Fukuy. - Kosrae
 Robiquetia ligulata (J.J.Sm.) Kocyan & Schuit.
 Robiquetia longipedunculata Schltr. - Sulawesi
 Robiquetia lutea (Volk) Schltr. - Caroline Islands
 Robiquetia lyonii (Ames) Kocyan & Schuit.
 Robiquetia millariae Ormerod - Solomons
 Robiquetia minahassae (Schltr.) J.J.Sm. - Sulawesi
 Robiquetia minimiflora (Hook.f.) Kocyan & Schuit.
 Robiquetia pachyphylla (Rchb.f.) Garay - Myanmar, Thailand, Vietnam
 Robiquetia palawensis Tuyama - Palau
 Robiquetia palustris (J.J.Sm.) Kocyan & Schuit.
 Robiquetia pantherina (Kraenzl.) Ames  - Philippines
 Robiquetia penangiana (Hook.f.) Kocyan & Schuit.
 Robiquetia pinosukensis J.J.Wood & A.L.Lamb in J.J.Wood & al. - Sabah, Sarawak
 Robiquetia punctata (J.J.Wood & A.L.Lamb) Kocyan & Schuit.
 Robiquetia reflexa (R.Boos & Cootes) Kocyan & Schuit.
 Robiquetia rosea (Lindl.) Garay - Karnataka, Sri Lanka
 Robiquetia sanguinicors (P.O'Byrne & J.J.Verm.) Kocyan & Schuit.
 Robiquetia schizogenia (Ferreras, Cootes & R.Boos) J.M.H.Shaw
 Robiquetia serpentina (J.J.Sm.) Kocyan & Schuit.
 Robiquetia spathulata (Blume) J.J.Sm - Hainan, Bhutan, Cambodia, Assam, Indonesia, Laos, Malaysia, Myanmar, Singapore, Thailand, Vietnam
 Robiquetia sphingoides (J.J.Sm.) Kocyan & Schuit.
 Robiquetia steffensii (Schltr.) Kocyan & Schuit.
 Robiquetia succisa (Lindl.) Seidenf. & Garay - Fujian, Guangdong, Guangxi, Hainan, Yunnan, Bhutan, Cambodia, Assam, Laos, Myanmar, Thailand, Vietnam, Bangladesh
 Robiquetia sulitiana (Ormerod) Kocyan & Schuit.
 Robiquetia sylvestris (Ridl.) Kocyan & Schuit.
 Robiquetia tomaniensis J.J.Wood & A.L.Lamb - Sabah
 Robiquetia tongaensis P.J.Cribb & Ormerod - Tonga
 Robiquetia transversisaccata (Ames & C.Schweinf.) J.J.Wood in J.J.Wood & al. - Sabah, Sarawak
 Robiquetia trukensis Tuyama - Chuuk
 Robiquetia vanoverberghii Ames - Philippines
 Robiquetia vaupelii (Schltr.) Ormerod & J.J.Wood - Fiji, Samoa
 Robiquetia vietnamensis (Guillaumin) Kocyan & Schuit.
 Robiquetia virescens Ormerod & S.S.Fernando - Sri Lanka
 Robiquetia viridirosea J.J.Sm. - Buru, Seram
 Robiquetia wariana (Schltr.) Kocyan & Schuit.
 Robiquetia wassellii Dockrill - Queensland
 Robiquetia witteana (Rchb.f.) Kocyan & Schuit.
 Robiquetia woodfordii (Rolfe) Garay - Solomons

Distribution
Orchids in the genus Robiquetia occur in China (2 species), the Indian subcontinent, Indochina, Malesia, New Guinea, the Solomon Islands, Fiji, Samoa, Tonga, Vanuatu and Queensland, Australia (2 species, 1 endemic).

References

External links

 
Vandeae genera